Jesús "Josu" Olalla Iraeta (born July 15, 1971) is a Spanish handball player who competed in the 1996 Summer Olympics and in the 2000 Summer Olympics.

He was born in Irun.

In 1996 he won the bronze medal with the Spanish team. He played all seven matches and scored 14 goals.

Four years later he won his second bronze medal with the Spanish handball team in the 2000 Olympic tournament. He played one match.

External links
 profile

1971 births
Living people
Spanish male handball players
Olympic handball players of Spain
Handball players at the 1996 Summer Olympics
Handball players at the 2000 Summer Olympics
Olympic bronze medalists for Spain
Sportspeople from Irun
Olympic medalists in handball
Medalists at the 2000 Summer Olympics
Medalists at the 1996 Summer Olympics
Handball players from the Basque Country (autonomous community)
20th-century Spanish people